Shepherd's Bush station  may refer to:

Shepherd's Bush railway station, open station served by London Overground
Shepherd's Bush railway station (1869-1916), closed station that was served by London and South Western Railway
Shepherd's Bush tube station, open station served by the Central line of the London Underground
Shepherd's Bush Market tube station, open station served by the Circle and Hammersmith & City lines of the London Underground
Stations around Shepherd's Bush, detailing all stations that have been in the Shepherd's Bush area of London